Jo Bo-ah (born Jo Bo-yoon on August 22, 1991) is a South Korean actress, model and host known for her roles in Goodbye to Goodbye (2018), My Strange Hero (2018), Forest (2020), Tale of the Nine Tailed (2020), and Military Prosecutor Doberman (2022) .

Early life
Jo Bo-ah was born Jo Bo-yoon on August 22, 1991, in Daejeon, South Korea. Jo graduated from Sungkyunkwan University, majoring in Performing Arts. She has a sister, Jo Yoo-ah.

Career
Jo made her acting debut in 2011 with a small role in the daily sitcom I Live in Cheongdam-dong on cable channel JTBC. This was followed by a hosting gig on the audition program Made in U (also on JTBC), and an appearance in the Korean-Japanese co-production Koisuru Maison ~Rainbow Rose~.

In 2012, Jo landed her first major role as a former rich girl who falls for a rocker in tvN's coming-of-age series Shut Up Flower Boy Band. Later that year, she appeared in her first network TV series with a supporting role in the MBC period drama Horse Doctor.

In 2013, Jo and Kim Woo-bin hosted Mnet's weekly music show M Countdown for two weeks (on April 4 and 11).

Jo was cast in her first film in 2014, as a troubled, seductive teenager who becomes obsessed with her gym teacher in the erotic thriller Innocent Thing. Back on cable television, she played the leading role in romantic comedy series The Idle Mermaid, a modern retelling of The Little Mermaid set amidst the competitive Korean workplace.

Jo tried a new genre in 2015 with the OCN police procedural drama The Missing, where she played a detective on the missing persons task force. She then joined the ensemble cast of the KBS weekend family drama All About My Mom, and starred in web series Love Cells 2, adapted from the webtoon of the same title.

In 2016, Jo starred in revenge melodrama Monster and romantic comedy series Sweet Stranger and Me. In 2017, she starred in romance melodrama Temperature of Love, and the two-episode drama special Let's Meet, Joo-oh.

In 2018, Jo starred in Goodbye to Goodbye, based on a webtoon about the stories of two women. She played a university student who faces challenges as a single mother. The same year, she starred in the romantic comedy drama My Strange Hero.

In 2020, Jo starred in the romance drama Forest as a doctor. The same year, she was cast in the fantasy drama Tale of the Nine Tailed as a television producer named as Nam Ji-ah.

In February 2021, Jo signed with KeyEast after the expiration of her contract from the former agency. In 2021, she was cast in a new military themed drama Military Prosecutor Doberman which airs in 2022 as Cha Woo-in, a military prosecutor who hides her vengeful persona. This drama is one of the highest rated Korean drama on cable television in Korea.

Filmography

Film

Television series

Web series

Television shows

Web shows

Hosting

Music video appearances

Ambassadorship 
 Public Relations Ambassador for the National Tax Service (2022)

Awards and nominations

State honors

Listicles

References

External links

 Official website at KeyEast 
 
 
 
 

South Korean television actresses
South Korean film actresses
21st-century South Korean actresses
1991 births
Living people
People from Daejeon
Sungkyunkwan University alumni